Bruno Ziener (11 June 1870 – 9 February 1941) was a German stage and film actor and director. He appeared in over 100 films between 1913 and 1941. He also directed 28 silent films such as The Flight into Death (1921).

Selected filmography

Director
 The Beggar Countess (1918)
 Maria (1919)
 The Flight into Death (1921)

Actor

 Die große Sünderin (1914) - Bankier Hausmann
 Lottekens Feldzug (1915)
 Der Brieföffner (1916) - Mörder
 Im Joche des Schicksals (1916) - Bankier Karl Heidinger
 Professor Erichsons Rivale (1916) - Prof. Dircksen
 Aussage verweigert (1916)
 Die Reise ins Jenseits (1916) - Herzog
 Der Schloßschrecken (1916)
 Der Fakir im Frack (1916) - Der Fakir im Frack
 The Night Talk (1917) - Jan Routt
 Das Nachtgespräch (1917)
 Königliche Bettler (1917)
 Aus vergessenen Akten (1917)
 Ein scharfer Schuss (1917)
 Der Fall Dombronowska...! (1917) - Kunstmaler Rietz
 Der Dieb (1918) - Benno, Freiherr von Lancken
 Das Tagebuch des Apothekers Warren (1918)
 Verworrene Wege (1918)
 Die Glocken der Katharinenkirche (1918)
 Indian Revenge (1920)
 Evening – Night – Morning (1920) - Cheston - Maud's lover
 Die Geheimnisse von New York (1920)
 Der Unheimliche (1922)
 Der falsche Prinz (1922) - Der Sterndeuter des Sultans
 I.N.R.I. (1923) - Simon Petrus
 Wood Love (1925) - Milon - General of the Greeks
 Guillotine (1925)
 The Circus Princess (1925)
 Bismarck (1925)
 The Director General (1925)
 The Bank Crash of Unter den Linden (1926) - Dr. Schumann
 Der Mann aus dem Jenseits (1926) - Lawyer
 State Attorney Jordan (1926) - Vorsitzender
 Bismarck 1862–1898 (1927)
 Out of the Mist (1927) - Jakob Hellmich
 Children's Souls Accuse You (1927) - Josef - Diener
 Ein Tag der Rosen im August... (1927) - Bankpräsident
 The Girl with the Five Zeros (1927) - Müller, Lotteriekollekteur
 The Prince of Rogues (1928) - Der alte Bückler
 Panic (1928)
 The Strange Night of Helga Wangen (1928) - Kaspar
 Eddy Polo in the Wasp's Nest (1928) - Diener bei Clarens
 Taxi at Midnight (1929) - W.S. Pinkus
 The Crimson Circle (1929) - Kriminalkommissar
 A Small Down Payment on Bliss (1929) - Ein alter Roué
 The Woman One Longs For (1929) - Diener
 Inherited Passions (1929)
 Durchs Brandenburger Tor. Solang noch Untern Linden... (1929) - Professor Berghaus
 Dear Homeland (1929)
 Men Without Work (1929) - Dupont
 A Mother's Love (1929)
 Anesthesia (1929) - Arzt
 The Call of the North (1929)
 The Mistress and her Servant (1929) - Baumgartner
 Dangers of the Engagement Period (1930) - Miller
 Police Spy 77 (1930)
 Das Mädel aus U.S.A. (1930) - Petroleumskönig
 Dreyfus (1930) - Alphonse Bertillon
 A Student's Song of Heidelberg (1930)
 1914 (1931) - Count von Schön
 The Man Who Murdered (1931) - Prospère - Diener bei Sévigné
 M (1931) - (uncredited)
 The Theft of the Mona Lisa (1931)
 Bombs on Monte Carlo (1931) - Jeweler
 The Victor (1932)
 Johnny Steals Europe (1932) - Rittmeister
 The Eleven Schill Officers (1932)
 The Heath Is Green (1932)
 Trenck (1932) - Alvensleben, Minister
 Marschall Vorwärts (1932) - Humboldt
 Ship Without a Harbour (1932)
 The Innocent Country Girl (1933) - Ein Fahrgast
 Manolescu, der Fürst der Diebe (1933)
 The Testament of Dr. Mabuse (1933)
 Heimat am Rhein (1933) - Ein Freund von Andreas
 There Is Only One Love (1933) - Kapellmeister
 Mother and Child (1934) - Diener bei Petersen
 Da stimmt was nicht (1934)
 Ein Kind, ein Hund, ein Vagabund (1934)
 Hearts are Trumps (1934)
 The Red Rider (1935) - Heckeli
 Alles um eine Frau (1935)
 Artisten (1935) - Kommissar Helmer
 Königstiger (1935)
 His Late Excellency (1935) - Bürovorsteher Lampe
 The Call of the Jungle (1936) - Petterson
 Family Parade (1936) - Frederik
 Schlußakkord (1936)
 The Hour of Temptation (1936) - Bürovorsteher Neumann
 Der Kaiser von Kalifornien (1936) - Bankier
 Diener lassen bitten (1936) - Jerome - der Butler
 Escapade (1936)
 Fridericus (1937) - General Zieten
 The Kreutzer Sonata (1937) - Diener Iwan
 The Glass Ball (1937) - Juwelier
 Talking About Jacqueline (1937) - William
 Land of Love (1937) - Ein Lakai
 My Son the Minister (1937) - Pierre, Diener
 Diamonds (1937) - Livrierter Diener im Speisesaal
 Fanny Elssler (1937)
 Tango Notturno (1937) - Der Diener bei den Gerards
 Das große Abenteuer (1938)
 The Secret Lie (1938) - Konzertsaaldiener (uncredited)
 Mordsache Holm (1938) - Notar Bertelsen
 Skandal um den Hahn (1938)
 Red Orchids (1938)
 Dance on the Volcano (1938) - Logenschließer (uncredited)
 The Night of Decision (1938) - Diener bei Brückmann
 Zwischen Strom und Steppe (1939) - Peter Wagner
 Bel Ami (1939) - Parlamentsdiener
 Water for Canitoga (1939) - Professor Deutsch
 Die Frau ohne Vergangenheit (1939)
 The Journey to Tilsit (1939) - Ober im Cafe
 Passion (1940)
 The Swedish Nightingale (1941)
 Der Weg ins Freie (1941) - Kantor des pommerschen Kinderchors
 The Gasman (1941) - Vornehmer alter Herr (final film role)

References

Bibliography

External links

1870 births
1941 deaths
German male stage actors
German male silent film actors
German male film actors
German film directors
People from Zwickau
20th-century German male actors